Three Hills was a provincial electoral district in Alberta mandated to return a single member to the Legislative Assembly of Alberta using the first past the post method of voting from 1963 to 1993.

History
The Three Hills electoral district was created in the 1963 electoral boundary re-distribution from the Didsbury, Gleichen, and Olds electoral districts.

The Three Hills electoral district was abolished in 1993 and merged with Drumheller to form Three Hills-Airdrie, which would last only one session before redistribution.

Three Hills is named for the Town of Three Hills, Alberta.

Members of the Legislative Assembly (MLAs)

Electoral history

1963 general election

1964 by-election

1967 general election

1971 general election

1975 general election

1979 general election

1982 general election

1986 general election

1989 general election

1992 by-election

See also
List of Alberta provincial electoral districts
Three Hills, Alberta, a town in Alberta

References

Further reading

External links
Elections Alberta
The Legislative Assembly of Alberta

Former provincial electoral districts of Alberta